Karina Wilvers (born 5 March 1983) is an Argentine rower. She competed in the women's double sculls and quadruple sculls at the 2015 Pan American Games.

References

Argentine female rowers
Rowers at the 2015 Pan American Games
Pan American Games bronze medalists for Argentina
Living people
1983 births
Pan American Games medalists in rowing
Medalists at the 2015 Pan American Games
21st-century Argentine women